Huangshi, alternatively romanized as Hwangshih, is a prefecture-level city in southeastern Hubei province, People's Republic of China.
Its population was 2,469,079 inhabitants at the 2020 census; 1,567,108 of whom lived in the built-up (or metro) area made up of 4 urban districts plus the city of Daye, now being part of the agglomeration.

History
In 845 BC Marquis Wen Huang Meng, or Huang Zhang moved the capital of the State of Huang from Yicheng to Huangchuan (present-day Huangchuan, Henan). Huang Xi's descendants ruled State of Huang until 648 BC when it was destroyed by the State of Chu. The Marquis of Huang, Marquis Mu Huang Qisheng, fled to the state of Qi. The people of Huang were forced to relocate to Chu. They settled in the region of present-day Hubei province, in a region known as the Jiangxia Prefecture during the Han dynasty (206 BC-AD 220). 

On 9 March 1944, 18 CACW B-25s escorted by 24 P-40s bombed a foundry and floating docks at Huangshi in Hubei. They were intercepted by Japanese fighters from the 25th and 9th Sentai and lost 2 P-40s.

Geography and climate
Huangshi is located in southeastern Hubei province, primarily along the southwestern bank of one of the major bends in the Yangtze River. The terrain is mostly small mountains and hills. Huangshi is also located in a major lake district between Hunan's Dongting Lake and Jiangxi's Poyang lake and has dozens of large lakes.
Huangshi's climate is sub-temperate. There are 264 frost free days. It is possible to see limited snowfall between December and February.

Administration
, Huangshi had 4 districts,  1 county, and 1 county-level city:

Demographics
According to the Fifth Population Census of China (2000), the entire prefecture-level city of Huangshi had 2,476,400 people, making for the population density of  540 people per square kilometer. More than 99% of the population belong to the Han ethnic group.

According to Google Maps  there are 686.894 people in Huangshi; this refers, presumably, to Huangshi's urban core (Huangshigang District
196,600 people, density 5757 people /km2;  West Fort Mountain (Xisaishan) Area,  244,000, density 2171 people /km2;  Xialu District,  146,600 people, density 2536 people /km2), and excludes the far-flung Yangxin County, Daye, and Tieshan.

Economy

Huangshi's GDP for 2003 was 27.5 billion CNY. Its proximity to Wuhan and location along major rail lines and the Yangtze River make Huangshi an important logistics, distribution, and transportation hub. Mineral resources are plentiful in Huangshi giving it the nickname "The Southern Cornucopia". Metals include iron, manganese, gold, copper, tungsten, molybdenum, zinc, lead, cobalt, silver, gallium, and thallium. Other mineral resources include germanium, indium, selenium, tellurium, sulfur, calcite, limestone, celestine, plaster, and many others.

Agriculture is also a major part of Huangshi's economy. There are more than 3000 species of plants in Huangshi, many of them used for food, pharmaceuticals, and fragrance.

Other industries include metallurgy, textiles, construction materials, energy, light manufacturing, electronics, pharmaceuticals, chemicals, and food processing.

2 of the biggest companies in the city are the Daye Steel Co. Ltd and Huaxin Cement Co. Ltd.

Transportation

The prefecture-level city is served by G45 Daqing–Guangzhou Expressway, G50 Shanghai–Chongqing Expressway, National Highways 106 and 316 and Wuhan–Jiujiang Railway.  The city has two Yangtze River crossings, the Huangshi Yangtze River Bridge and the Edong Yangtze River Bridge.

Many of the passenger trains traveling on the Wuhan–Jiujiang Railway between Wuhan (Wuchang and Wuhan Stations) and the points southeast make stops at the Huangshi and Yangxin stations. The Yangxin Station is near Yangxin County's county seat, Xingguo Town.

Although Huangshi's main urban area is some distance away from the  Wuhan–Jiujiang Railway mainline, it is connected to it by a dead-end branch, of considerable importance for the local industries. It runs all the way to Huangshi's river port on the Yangtze. There was even a downtown passenger station on this branch (Huangshi East Railway Station), but, it was served by very few trains, and by 2015, was not in operation anymore.

In 2014, the Wuhan-Huangshi line of the Wuhan Metropolitan Area Intercity Railway opened. Huahu, although technically situated within the boundaries of Ezhou City, is actually located on the north-western edge of Huangshi's central city; Haungshi North is in Xialu District, in the western part of Huangshi's central city; the Daye North station is north-east of Daye.

Tourism

Huangshi is situated amongst numerous picturesque lakes and mountains. One of Huangshi's more famous sites is the Buddhist Temple on Dongfang Mountain, Cihu Lake, Xisaishan, TuanChengShan Park, and Qingshan Lake with connecting Ci Lake.

Cihu Lake with surrounding Cihu Lake Scenery Park separates the older areas of Huangshi to the newer government development zone.

The former eastern pit of the Daye Iron Mine, which operated from the late 1890s until 2000, has been converted into Huangshi National Mining Park, where visitors can see a variety of mining equipment from the past and the present.

Xisaishan, located on the south bank of the Yangtze River in the eastern part of the city, provides views of the city and Yangtze River below (considered a 3A class tourist attraction).

Notable residents
Cheng Fei, gymnast (b. 1988)
Chen Shu (actress), (b. 1977)

References

External links

Official Newspaper(Chinese)

 
Cities in Hubei
Prefecture-level divisions of Hubei
Wuhan urban agglomeration
Port cities and towns in China
Populated places on the Yangtze River